The 1985 Tipperary Senior Hurling Championship was the 95th staging of the Tipperary Senior Hurling Championship since its establishment by the Tipperary County Board in 1887.

Moycarkey-Borris were the defending champions.

On 13 October 1985, Kilruane MacDonaghs won the championship after a 2-11 to 0-10 defeat of Roscrea in the final at Semple Stadium. It was their fourth championship title overall and their first title since 1979.

Results

Quarter-finals

Semi-finals

Final

Championship statistics

Top scorers

Overall

In a single game

References

Tipperary
Tipperary Senior Hurling Championship